Psammopolia arietis is a moth of the family Noctuidae. It occurs on Pacific Coast sand beaches from Mendocino, California to south-western Alaska. It is absent from the inland Strait of Georgia.

Adults are on wing from late July to early September.

The larvae live in sand dunes and feed on Lathyrus littoralis, Polygonum paronychia, Abronia latifolia and an unspecified grass.

External links
 Crabo, L. & Lafontaine, D. (2009). A Revision of Lasionycta Aurivillius (Lepidoptera, Noctuidae) for North America and notes on Eurasian species, with descriptions of 17 new species, 6 new subspecies, a new genus, and two new species of Tricholita Grote. Zookeys 30: 1-156.

Hadeninae
Moths of North America